Den Nationale Scene is the largest theatre in Bergen, Norway. Den Nationale Scene is also one of the oldest permanent theatres in Norway.

History

Opened under the name Det Norske Theater in 1850,  the theatre has roots dating back to its founding on the initiative of the Norwegian violinist Ole Bull. The theatre was created to develop Norwegian playwrights. Henrik Ibsen was one of the first writers-in-residences and art-directors of the theatre and it saw the première in Norway of his first contemporary realist drama The Pillars of Society (Samfundets støtter) on 30 November 1877.

The theatre was initially housed in the Komediehuset på Engen. In 1909, The National Theatre moved into the new theatre building at Engen. The current theatre building was designed by Einar Oscar Schou, and opened 19 February 1909 with a production of Erasmus Montanus by Ludvig Holberg. King Haakon VII of Norway and Queen Maud were in attendance. It soon became apparent that the building was too small. In 1913 the company bought Ekserserhuset Jonsvoll to use as a warehouse. In 1920, an extension was built to the northwest. Over the years the building has undergone major changes, extensions, renovation, restoration and stage technical modernisation. The foyer and the hall were destroyed during the Second World War, and only temporarily restored.

The theatre experienced a pre-war high point during the period 1934-39 under the leadership Hans Jacob Nilsen. Especially noteworthy was the 1935 premiere of the play Vår ære og vår makt ("Our Honor and our Power") by Nordahl Grieg.

In 2001 the building was restored almost to its original shape. Today the theatre houses three stages/venues and presents approximately 20 productions each year, both international and national classics, musicals and contemporary drama, as well as children's theatre.  Since 1993, the theatre has been state property.

Directors of the Theatre 

 1876–1879 Nils Wichstrøm
 1879–1880 Johan Bøgh
 1880–1881 John Grieg
 1881–1884 Johan Bøgh
 1884–1888 Gunnar Heiberg
 1888–1889 Henrik Jæger
 1889–1890 Otto Valseth
 1890–1895 Johan Irgens-Hansen
 1895–1898 Olaf Hansson
 1899–1900 Hans Aanrud
 1900–1905 Gustav Thomassen
 1905–1907 Anton Heiberg
 1908–1909 Olaf Mørch Hansson
 1910–1924 Ludvig Bergh
 1924–1925 Christian Sandal
 1925–1931 Thomas Thomassen
 1931–1934 Karl Bergmann
 1934–1939 Hans Jacob Nilsen
 1939–1946 Egil Hjorth-Jenssen
 1946–1948 Stein Bugge
 1948–1952 Georg Løkkeberg
 1952–1961 Per Schwab
 1961–1963 Bjarne Andersen
 1963–1967 Gisle Straume
 1967–1976 Knut Thomassen
 1976–1982 Sven Henning
 1982–1986 Kjetil Bang-Hansen
 1986–1996 Tom Remlov
 1996–1997 Ketil Egge
 1997 Aksel-Otto Bull
 1998 Lars Arrhed
 1998–2001 Bentein Baardson
 2001–2007 Morten Borgersen
 2008–2012 Bjarte Hjelmeland
 2012– Agnete Haaland

See also
Thorolf Rafto Memorial Prize

References

Further reading

External links
 Den Nationale Scene

Theatres in Bergen
1850 establishments in Norway